The Party of Bulgarian Social Democrats (Partiya Balgarski Sotsialdemokrati, PBSD) is a social-democratic political party in Bulgaria. It is a member of the Socialist International and the Party of European Socialists.

History
The party was launched on 26 November 1989 under the name Bulgarian Social Democratic Workers' Party (United). It sees itself as the historical successor to the Bulgarian Social Democratic Workers' Party of 1894. In January 1990 it adopted the name Bulgarian Social Democratic Party and in February Petar Dertliev was elected chairman. Subsequently, the party joined the Union of Democratic Forces. After a rift in the relations the BSDP left the Union and founded the "SDS-Centre" along with the movement Ekoglasnost. The coalition received 3.2% of the vote in the legislative elections in 1991 and failed to enter the National Assembly. Until 1994 BSDP participated in the coalition "Democratic Alternative for the Republic", which also failed to overcome the 4% threshold in the elections in the 1994 election. Since 1995 a process of returning to the SDS began and so the party contested the next elections in 1994 within the United Democratic Forces.

Since autumn 1997 a part of the leadership seek a rapprochement with other social-democratic parties in Bulgaria. In March 1998 the Movement for Social Humanism separated from the party. An extraordinary party congress at the end of 1998 caused another split. A right wing, dissatisfied with the policies pursued by Dertlijev, split from the party and held the ties with the United Democratic Forces. The BSDP entered the centre-left Coalition for Bulgaria and in 2002, changed its name to Party of Bulgarian Social Democrats.

Georgi Anastasov, the party leader gained a seat in the National Assembly in 2001 and he has been reelected ever since.

List of chairmen 
Atanas Moskov — 1989–1990
Petar Dertliev — 1990–1998
Peter Agov — 1998–2001
Georgi Anastasov — 2001 – (unknown)
 Aleksandra Hristova – 2016–today

References

External links
Official website

1989 establishments in Bulgaria
Full member parties of the Socialist International
Parties related to the Party of European Socialists
Political parties established in 1989
Social democratic parties in Bulgaria
Social democratic parties in Europe